Mickey Goldmill is a fictional character created by Sylvester Stallone and portrayed by Burgess Meredith in the Rocky film series. Meredith was nominated for the Academy Award for Best Supporting Actor for his performance in the first film, as was his co-star Burt Young. The character's gravelly voice, intense demeanor and popular catchphrases helped make him highly recognizable as well as a common source of parody and satire in pop culture.

Development

Mickey may be based on Charley Goldman. Both were bantamweights, Jewish, and had similar-sounding names. In addition, Goldman was the boxing trainer of Rocky Marciano, on whom Rocky Balboa is largely based. Goldman trained Marciano in many ways similar to how Goldmill trained Balboa, such as tying their ankles together with string to teach them to spread their feet at the appropriate width. Goldman was (again like Goldmill) well known for making wise remarks (ex. "A lot of people say Rocky [Marciano] don't look too good in there, but the guy on the ground don't look too good either.").

Fictional biography
According to his memorial plaque, Mickey Goldmill was born on April 7, 1905, to a Jewish family. He boxed professionally from 1947 until 1992 and achieved great athletic success but never gained any measure of fame or material success. Goldmill recalled that he once knocked his opponent, Ginny Russell, out of the ring the same day that Luis Firpo did the same to Jack Dempsey: September 14, 1923. Goldmill claimed that the reason his victory did not garner any media attention was that he did not have a manager, while Dempsey did. He retired in 1947, with a record of 72 Wins, (70 K.O.'s) 1 Loss. Some time after his retirement (in 1948), he opened a boxing gym in Philadelphia, Mighty Mick's Boxing, and began to train fighters. There is an apparent continuity error on Goldmill's actual birth year. In late 1975, he tells Rocky that he's 76 years old, which would have meant he was born in either 1898 or 1899. However, his memorial plaque says he was born in 1905. It is possible that he lied about his age (stating that he was 23 when he was actually 17) to start boxing and kept up the pretense for the rest of his life. Although, in Rocky III, his headstone mentions that he died in 1981, which still would've made him 76 (in reality 83 or 84 years old), keeping in line with the Rocky "universe", and not real life.

Rocky

In the first film, Goldmill manages his gym. One of the regulars in his gym is Rocky Balboa, a local club fighter who had never realized his potential and had instead become a collector for a local loan shark. Goldmill does not treat Balboa with much respect, and evicts him from his locker at the gym. Deep down, however, Goldmill wants Balboa to fulfill his great potential.

When heavyweight champion Apollo Creed gives Balboa an unlikely shot at the title, Goldmill approaches him about being his manager. Based on their uneasy prior relationship, Balboa is initially resistant, but nevertheless agrees to let Goldmill train him. The match takes place on January 1, 1976, at the Philadelphia Spectrum. While Balboa loses the match to Creed based on scoring by the judges, he manages to last the full 15 rounds, a first for any of Creed's opponents.

Rocky II

Rocky II picks up directly after the first film. Creed challenges Balboa to a rematch while Balboa is still in the hospital. Goldmill states that there will be no rematch and that Balboa won the match. Eventually, after Creed's efforts at publicly embarrassing Balboa into a fight, Goldmill again becomes Balboa's trainer for the rematch. For the second fight with Creed, Goldmill utilizes unique training methods (such as chasing and attempting to catch a chicken) to help Balboa gain speed. He also converts Balboa from a left-handed fighting style to a right-handed style in an effort to both confuse Creed and to protect an eye Balboa had a detached retina in the previous match. The rematch takes place and, after an almost double-KO, Balboa is able to get up and win.

Rocky III

At the beginning of Rocky III, set three years after Rocky won the championship, Goldmill trains Balboa to a series of successful title defenses, before both men decide that it is time for them to retire (Goldmill, now living with the Balboas in a mansion outside of Philadelphia, is suffering heart problems by this time, though he keeps this hidden from Balboa). But the brutal challenger James "Clubber" Lang accuses the two of avoiding him, publicly taunting Balboa and making rude remarks to his wife Adrian. Finally, Balboa agrees to face Lang in a match which he figures will be his last title defense. Goldmill tells Balboa that he will have to do it alone if he decides to have a match against Lang, later admitting that all of his challengers were hand-picked, "good fighters" but not "killers" like Lang. Upon this reveal, Balboa is even more eager to accept the challenge in order to prove his worth, and is eventually able to convince Goldmill to train him anyway, with the promise that this would be their last match.

The matchup is set for August 15, 1981. Shortly before the match, Balboa and Lang's entourages erupt into a pandemonium free-for-all backstage, and Goldmill, trying to break it up, is pushed against a wall by Lang, and goes into cardiac arrest. Balboa attempts to call off the match due to Goldmill's condition, but Goldmill refuses to allow him to stop now. His condition worsens as the match goes on, but Goldmill refuses to go to the hospital until the match is over, so the aids begin to keep him on life-support. Balboa, still distraught over losing Goldmill, is not fully focused on the match, is quickly overpowered, takes a merciless beating from his opponent. The fight only lasts two rounds before Lang knocks Balboa out.

Eventually, Rocky returns to the dressing room to check on Goldmill's condition. Balboa tells his trainer that the fight ended in a second-round knockout but does not tell Goldmill that he lost. Balboa then tries to convince Goldmill that they need to go to the hospital, but instead, he keeps talking, telling Balboa, "I love you, kid", and dies.

He is interred in a Jewish mausoleum outside of Philadelphia, the private service attended by Balboa, his wife Adrian, his brother-in-law Paulie and Goldmill's longtime friend and cornerman Al Silvani.

Balboa later defeats Lang in a rematch with the help of his former nemesis Apollo Creed and Creed's trainer Tony "Duke" Evers.

Rocky V 

Meredith reprises the role of Mickey Goldmill in the fifth installment, in a flashback to Balboa's first fight with Creed. Goldmill gives Balboa a cufflink that belonged to Rocky Marciano. He tells Rocky never to give up no matter how much he hurts, and tells him he loves him.

It is revealed that in his will, Goldmill left his gym to Rocky's son, Robert Balboa Jr. This was the last time Burgess Meredith appeared without the use of archival footage, as he died on September 9, 1997.

Video games
Mickey appears in the video games Rocky and Rocky Legends, offering advice to the player in between rounds. In Rocky Legends, the player earns money for winning fights, which can be then be used to buy venues or unlock boxers. One such boxer is a younger Mickey Goldmill when he was in active boxing, before he turned to managing.

References 

Rocky characters
Fictional professional boxers
Fictional sports coaches
Fictional characters from Philadelphia
Fictional American Jews
Film characters introduced in 1976